Marfanoid (or Marfanoid habitus) is a constellation of symptoms resembling those of Marfan syndrome, including long limbs, with an arm span that is at least 1.03 of the height of the individual, and a crowded oral maxilla, sometimes with a high arch in the palate, arachnodactyly, and hyperlaxity.


Signs and symptoms
Arachnodactyly (long fingers), long limbs, scoliosis (curved spine), a hidden feature of bony lip growth towards vestibular aqueduct (which can be seen in CT scan reports), and imprecise articulation of speech due to high-arched palate are all considered Marfanoid symptoms. Language and cognition can be affected in neonatal Marfan syndrome where intellectual disability exists. Hearing may be impaired, either by conductive loss due to hypermobility of ossicles, by inflamed tympanic membrane, or sensorineurally through the vestibular aqueduct. In cases with hearing impairment, giddiness and imbalance may co-occur. Other symptoms include crowding of teeth and long or flat feet, often with hammer toes.

Associated conditions 
Marfanoid habitus is a constellation of symptoms which are generally associated with other syndromes such as Ehlers-Danlos syndrome, Perrault syndrome and Stickler syndrome. Associated conditions include:
  Multiple endocrine neoplasia type 2B
 Homocystinuria
  Ehlers-Danlos syndrome: Marfanoid habitus is generally associated with hypermobile Ehlers-Danlos.
 Snyder–Robinson syndrome at SMS, whose incidence is about 1 in 5,000-10,000 in all ethnic groups
 Perrault syndrome : Marfanoid habitus is a nonspecific feature of Perrault syndrome.

Diagnosis

Medical diagnostic criteria to differentiate Marfanoid habitus  from Marfan syndrome:

References

Congenital disorders